Monday Chukwuma Nkwoagu is an Anglican bishop in Nigeria: he is the current Bishop of Abakaliki, one of twelve within the Anglican Province of Enugu, itself one of 14 provinces within the Church of Nigeria.

Notes

External links
 The Guardian, Nigeria

Living people
Anglican bishops of Abakaliki
21st-century Anglican bishops in Nigeria
Year of birth missing (living people)